Total Depravity is the fifth studio album by London-based band the Veils. It was released by Nettwerk Productions on 26 August 2016.

Track listing

Charts

References

External links 
 

2016 albums
Albums produced by El-P
Alternative rock albums by English artists
Blues albums by English artists
Gothic country albums
Gothic rock albums by English artists
Nettwerk Records albums
Post-punk albums by English artists
Soul albums by English artists
The Veils albums